Katsumi Hirosawa (広澤 克実, born April 10, 1962) is a former Nippon Professional Baseball player. A slugger who divided his time between infield (first base and third base) and the outfield, Hirosawa played for the Yakult Swallows, the Yomiuri Giants, and the Hanshin Tigers. Hirosawa was a four-time Central League Best Nine Award-winner, an eight-time NPB All-Star (including winning the NPB All-Star Game MVP in the 1991 Game 2), and twice led the Central League in RBI.

Before joining the Swallows, Hirosawa played baseball for Japan in the 1984 Summer Olympics. Although baseball was a demonstration sport during that Olympics (and no medals were awarded), the Japanese team defeated the United States to take the "gold medal."

Hirosawa was part of the Central League-champion Swallows team that lost the 1992 Japan Series to Seibu, as well as the championship team that defeated the Lions in a rematch in 1993.

Hirosawa topped off his playing career as part of the 2003 Hanshin Tigers squad that narrowly lost the Japan Series to the Fukuoka Daiei Hawks.

After retiring he served as a coach on the Tigers from 2007–2008.

See also 
 List of top Nippon Professional Baseball home run hitters

External links

1962 births
Living people
Baseball players at the 1984 Summer Olympics
Hanshin Tigers players
Japanese baseball coaches
Medalists at the 1984 Summer Olympics
Meiji University alumni
Nippon Professional Baseball coaches
Nippon Professional Baseball first basemen
Nippon Professional Baseball third basemen
Olympic baseball players of Japan
Olympic gold medalists for Japan
Baseball people from Ibaraki Prefecture
Yakult Swallows players
Yomiuri Giants players